Marie Therese Höbinger (born 1 July 2001) is an Austrian footballer who plays as a midfielder for German Frauen-Bundesliga club 1. FFC Turbine Potsdam and as a forward for the Austria women's national team.

International goals

Personal life
Höbinger is also a German citizen.

References

External links
Marie Therese Höbinger at oefb.at

2001 births
Living people
Footballers from Vienna
Austrian women's footballers
Women's association football midfielders
Women's association football forwards
Austria women's international footballers
German women's footballers
2. Frauen-Bundesliga players
Frauen-Bundesliga players
1. FFC Turbine Potsdam players
UEFA Women's Euro 2022 players
Expatriate women's footballers in Germany
Austrian expatriate sportspeople in Germany
Austrian expatriate women's footballers